Urbano Zea (31 January 1969 – 6 April 2018) was a Mexican freestyle and butterfly swimmer. He competed in four events at the 1988 Summer Olympics. He died in Miami, Florida on 6 April 2018 from a heart attack.

References

External links
 

1969 births
2018 deaths
Mexican male butterfly swimmers
Mexican male freestyle swimmers
Olympic swimmers of Mexico
Swimmers at the 1988 Summer Olympics
Sportspeople from Ciudad Juárez